Ben Shelton (born October 9, 2002) is an American professional tennis player. Shelton has a career-high ATP singles ranking of No. 39 achieved on 20 March 2023. He also has a career-high ATP doubles ranking of No. 280 achieved on 14 November 2022.

Shelton won the 2016 USTA junior national championship in doubles. He played college tennis for the Florida Gators. As a true freshman in 2021, he clinched the Gators’ first team national championship with his victory at fifth singles; the following year, he won the men's singles title at the 2022 NCAA Division I Tennis Championships. That same year, he was named the ITA National Player of the Year.

Early and personal life
Shelton is the son of former professional tennis player and Florida Gators men's tennis coach, Bryan Shelton. His mother, Lisa Witsken Shelton, was a highly-ranked junior tennis player, his uncle, Todd Witsken, was a professional tennis player and his sister, Emma, played college tennis at Florida. Shelton was born in Atlanta, Georgia, as his father was the-then coach of Georgia Tech's women's tennis team. He currently lives in Gainesville, Florida and graduated from Buchholz High School.

Junior career
As a child, Shelton did not want to play tennis and, instead, played American football. Despite both of his parents having connections to the game of tennis, they did not pressure him to play the sport. At age 12, Shelton began playing tennis regularly and was coached by his father, Bryan, who is a college tennis coach.

When Shelton turned 16, he considered playing ITF Junior tournaments abroad, but his father urged him not to do so saying: "Why do you need to travel abroad when you're not the best [player in the U.S.]?" Shelton ultimately credits his father's advice not to play ITF Junior tournaments abroad as helping his tennis development because he was not constantly traveling and instead had a routine.

Shelton peaked at a high of the No. 3 player in the USTA Boy's 18s division and No. 306 ITF Junior. He was a finalist at the 2020 USTA Boys 18s Singles Winter Nationals and won the 2019 USTA Boys 16s Doubles Clay Court tournament.

College career

In June 2020, on Father's Day, Shelton committed to play collegiate tennis for the Florida Gators, under his father, Coach Bryan Shelton.

A finance major, Shelton helped lead the Gators to their first national championship. Shelton had a singles record of 10-2 and won the championship-clinching match for the Gators.

In 2022, Shelton shined during his sophomore year going 37-5 in singles matches and winning the NCAA Singles Championship over August Holmgren. He finished the year as the No. 1 singles player in ITA rankings. He was subsequently named the 2022 ITA National Player of the Year and the 2022 SEC Player of the Year.

As a rising-junior, Shelton was slated to return to Florida for the 2023 school year and stated he wanted to complete his finance degree. Shortly after his successful run at the 2022 Cincinnati Masters, Shelton announced he would forgo his remaining college eligibility to turn professional and continue his college education online.

Professional career

2022: Three Challenger titles, ATP & Major & Masters & top 100 debuts, first top-5 win
At the Georgia's Rome Challenger in July, Shelton reached his first Challenger final, losing to Wu Yibing. The next week at the Indy Challenger, he reached the semifinals, highlighted by a win over world No. 103 Tim van Rijthoven.

He made his ATP Tour debut at the Atlanta Open as a wildcard, and in the first round he defeated Ramkumar Ramanathan for his first ATP win. He lost his next match to the No. 2 seed John Isner in three sets. Shelton received a wildcard entry into the Cincinnati Masters. In the first round, he defeated world No. 56 Lorenzo Sonego in three sets for his first win over a top-100 player. In the 2nd round, Shelton faced world No. 5 Casper Ruud in his first matchup against a top-10 opponent. Shelton defeated Ruud, in straight sets, by a score of 6–3, 6–3 for his first top-10 win.

On August 23, 2022, Shelton announced he was forgoing returning to college and would turn professional. He announced that he would be represented by agent Alessandro Sant Albano, who is a part of Roger Federer's TEAM8 management firm.

He also received a wildcard to appear in the main draw for his Grand Slam debut at the US Open on August 14. He lost in the first round, in five sets, to Nuno Borges while also recording the second fastest serve of the US Open tournament at 139 mph in this match. He also competed in doubles having paired with fellow American Christopher Eubanks. They were eliminated in the second round after defeating Stefanos Tsitsipas and Petros Tsitsipas in the first round.

He reached his third Challenger final of the year at the 2022 Tiburon Challenger after defeating top seed Denis Kudla. As a result he moved into the top 160 in the rankings on 10 October 2022. He advanced to his fourth Challenger final at the Charlottesville Men's Pro Challenger where he defeated his doubles' partner Christopher Eubanks to secure his first Challenger title. As a result he moved into the top 150 in the rankings at world No. 128 on 7 November. His fifth Challenger final featured a repeat of his last with a win against Christopher Eubanks in the Knoxville Challenger which lifted him another 20 positions up to No. 108 in the rankings on 14 November. After winning his third straight title at the Champaign–Urbana Challenger, he debuted in the top 100 of the rankings ending the year at world No. 97 on 21 November 2022 and became the youngest player in ATP Challenger Tour history to win three titles in three weeks. He was also the youngest American in the Top 250.

2023: Australian Open debut and quarterfinal, top 50
On his debut at the 2023 Australian Open, Shelton reached the fourth round, with wins against Zhang Zhizhen, Nicolás Jarry, and Alexei Popyrin. This was only Shelton's second Grand Slam after the 2022 US Open. Next he defeated compatriot J. J. Wolf to reach the quarterfinal of a Major for the first time in his career. His run concluded with a four-set loss to fellow American Tommy Paul. As a result, he moved 45 positions up into the top 50, at world No. 44, for the first time in his career.

Shelton started the American hard court portion of the season with a loss in straight sets to Marcos Giron in the first round of the 2023 Delray Beach Open. At the Mexican Open, he also lost in the first round, in three sets, to the fourth seed Holger Rune. At Indian Wells, Shelton defeated Fabio Fognini in the first round, later losing to fellow American Taylor Fritz in the second round.

Endorsements
As of March 2023, Shelton is sponsored by On for clothing and Yonex for racquets. He will continue wearing New Balance footwear until On's release of Roger Federer's new edition of The Roger Pro later in the season.

Playing style
Shelton's best weapon is his serve. He has the ability to hit a big first serve, which averages 126 miles-per-hour. (203 kilometers-per-hour). He also can produce a significant amount of kick on both first and second serves. A left-handed player, Shelton is powerful and consistent on both the forehand and backhand side. He is comfortable moving to the net off his powerful groundstrokes to finish points. Shelton has said "I love to get to net, be able to use some of my hand skills, athletic skills and going up to get the ball (to put away overheads) is one of my favorite things to do..." He has said that the serve-and-volley is an important part of his game and an area he wants to further develop.

Career statistics and records

Singles 
Current through the 2023 BNP Paribas Open.

Doubles

ATP Challenger and ITF Futures finals

Singles: 7 (4–3)

Doubles: 2 (1–1)

Record against top 10 players
Shelton's record against players who have been ranked in the top 10, with those who are active in boldface.

Wins over top 10 players
 He has a  record against players who were, at the time the match was played, ranked in the top 10.

*

Explanatory notes

References

External links
 
 
 Florida Gators bio

2002 births
Living people
African-American male tennis players
American male tennis players
Florida Gators men's tennis players
Tennis people from Florida